Çığırğan (also, Chygyrgan and Chagyrgan) is a village and municipality in the Sabirabad Rayon of Azerbaijan.  It has a population of 786.

References 

Populated places in Sabirabad District